Sam Meech (born 4 April 1991) is a New Zealand sailor who won a bronze medal at the 2016 Summer Olympics.

Early life
Meech was born in Portsmouth, England, in 1991. The sailor Molly Meech is his younger sister; almost exactly two years his junior. When he was three and a half years old, their parents gave up their house and the family lived on a boat for the next decade; the siblings attribute their affinity to water to this period of their lives. He received his secondary education at Tauranga Boys' College, where fellow Olympic sailors Jason Saunders (born 1990) and Peter Burling (born 1991) were his contemporaries.

Sailing career
Meech finished 34th in the Laser class at the 2011 ISAF Sailing World Championships and won a Halberg emerging talent award in 2011.

In 2013 he won the men's Laser race at the Sail for Gold competition and in 2014 he won the men's Laser competition at the EUROSAF Champions Sailing Cup. He was part of the New Zealand team that won the 2013 Youth America's Cup.

Close friends Meech and Andy Maloney had an intense battle to win New Zealand's selection for the one quota spot for the 2016 Summer Olympics. Meech won a bronze medal in the 2015 ISAF Sailing World Cup sailing regatta in Miami (USA) in January, and a silver medal at a later regatta in Hyères (France) in April; these results won him the selection over Maloney. Meech and Josh Junior made up the last two Olympic nominees of the New Zealand sailing team in May 2016. Meech won a bronze medal in the Laser class; the first time that a New Zealand competitor has won an Olympic medal in this class. His sister, Molly Meech, also competed for New Zealand at the 2016 Olympics in the 49erFX class alongside Alex Maloney, the sister of Andy Maloney.

References

External links
 
 
 
 

1991 births
Living people
People educated at Tauranga Boys' College
Olympic sailors of New Zealand
New Zealand sportsmen
New Zealand male sailors (sport)
Sailors at the 2016 Summer Olympics – Laser
Sportspeople from Tauranga
Sportspeople from Portsmouth
Medalists at the 2016 Summer Olympics
Olympic bronze medalists for New Zealand
Olympic medalists in sailing
Sailors at the 2020 Summer Olympics – Laser